Lovers is the first album by the Australian band The Sleepy Jackson. The album entered the ARIA Album charts at #21, the UK Album Charts at #69 and the French Album Charts at #117.

The album was a minor commercial success, selling around 100,000 copies worldwide. 

At the ARIA Music Awards of 2003, the album was nominated for four awards.

In October 2010, Lovers was listed in the book, 100 Best Australian Albums.

Track listing

Original release
"Good Dancers" – 4:12
"Vampire Racecourse" – 3:10
"Rain Falls for Wind" – 4:03
"This Day" – 3:48
"Acid in My Heart" – 3:31
"Fill Me with Apples" – 1:05
"Tell the Girls That I'm Not Hangin' Out" – 4:13
"Come to This" – 3:28
"Morning Bird" – 2:17
"Don't You Know" – 5:12
"Old Dirt Farmer" – 3:31
"Mourning Rain" – 2:06

International release
"Good Dancers" – 4:12
"Vampire Racecourse" – 3:10
"Rain Falls for Wind" – 4:03
"This Day" – 3:48
"Acid in My Heart" – 3:31
"Fill Me with Apples" – 1:05
"Tell the Girls That I'm Not Hangin' Out" – 4:13
"Come to This" – 3:28
"Miniskirt" (bonus track) – 4:08
"Morning Bird" – 2:17
"Don't You Know" – 5:12
"Old Dirt Farmer" – 3:31
"Mourning Rain" – 2:06
"Sunkids" (Japan-only bonus track) – 3:17

Charts

Weekly charts

References

2003 debut albums
The Sleepy Jackson albums